Phasianellidae, with the common name "pheasant shells" or "pheasant snails", is a family of small sea snails with calcareous opercula, marine gastropod mollusks in the subclass Vetigastropoda.

Taxonomy 
The family Phasianellidae consists of three subfamilies:
 Gabrieloninae Hickman & J.H. McLean, 1990
 Gabrielona Iredale, 1917 - type genus of the subfamily Gabrieloninae
 Phasianellinae Swainson, 1840 - synonym: Eutropiinae Gray, 1871
 Mimelenchus Iredale, 1924 
 Orthomesus Pilsbry, 1888
 Phasianella Lamarck, 1804
 Tricoliinae Woodring, 1928
 Tricolia Risso, 1826 - type genus of the subfamily Tricoliinae

Additionally there are two additional genera not placed in any subfamily:
 Eulithidium Pilsbry, 1898
 Hiloa Pilsbry, 1917

References